Dragon Around is a 1954 American animated short film directed by Jack Hannah and produced by Walt Disney, featuring Donald Duck and Chip 'n' Dale.

Plot 
Dale is reading a book of fairy tales with a story about a brave warrior fighting a mighty dragon. Fascinated with the action and drama of being a knight, Dale mimics the adventure in his own way. Suddenly, a loud noise comes in, & a scary shadow appears. The features of the "monster" make Dale instantly expect he's face-to-face with a dragon, and with that, he scurries home to find Chip. He ends up crashing into him carrying acorns and rapidly explains everything. The duo go to find the monster; however, it left. Chip beats up Dale in anger but the rumbling starts happening as the monster reappears, Chip and Dale hide in their stash of nuts without even finding out that it's none other than a steam shovel, Donald Duck being its owner. Donald finds that if their tree is in the way, he can't build his freeway.

The tractor starts digging, warning Chip and Dale that if they don't move fast, they and their tree will be goners. The chipmunks retaliate by hitting & pelting it with objects. Seeing the retaliation scene, Donald grabs the grass with his tractor, flinging Chip and Dale away. Inspired by the fairy tale, the chipmunks make their own costumes and become knights, their goal being to save their home. Chip and Dale hurry to the battlefield, where Donald is preparing a surprise attack by mounting a flamethrower in the shovel which burns Chip's sword, forcing them to retreat. As Donald's tractor pretends to sleep, Chip and Dale sneak up on the beast, before unleashing the attack. Donald sets the tractor on the chipmunks to squash them, but they manage to escape. Thinking they killed the tractor, the chipmunks celebrate, but they are grabbed and chomped by it. Inside, realizing they got eaten, the chipmunks push their way out with a pipe. Infuriated, Donald gives it a new tooth: a golden one.

A wild goose chase then occurs, with Chip and Dale retaliating by pelting a boulder & throwing a barrel of tar on the predator, leaving it with no teeth. The chipmunks evacuate, but Donald grabs them and sets them in a toolbox. Chip and Dale make their getaway with a saw and use wrenches to dismantle the tractor. All that remains of it are Donald and the chair who crash beak-first, leaving Donald dazed while the chipmunks roll back home. The chipmunks taunt Donald, who figures that if he can't force them out, he'll blast them out with dynamite. He sets firecrackers around the tree, lights the dynamite, and rushes off to await the explosion, but Chip and Dale extinguish the firecrackers, collect them, and replace the rungs on the ladder with the dynamite. Dale gets Donald alert, who then pursues him until he gets him to stop, look and listen. When Donald finds out about the charade, he quickly hurries off with the dynamite. The dynamite ladder explodes multiple times sending Donald high into the air. As they witness, Chip plays a trick on Dale; he pretends that he's the monster. When Dale finds out about the prank, the chipmunks share a good laugh as the short concludes.

Voice cast
 Donald Duck: Clarence Nash
 Chip: Jimmy MacDonald
 Dale: Dessie Flynn

Television
The Mouse Factory, episode #8: "Man at Work"
Good Morning, Mickey, episode #12
Mickey's Mouse Tracks, episode #48
Donald's Quack Attack, episode #58
The Ink and Paint Club, episode #1.5 "Chip 'n' Dale"

Home media
The short was released on November 11, 2008, on Walt Disney Treasures: The Chronological Donald, Volume Four: 1951-1961.

Additional releases include:
 Mickey Mouse and Donald Duck Cartoon Collections, Volume One (VHS)
 Walt Disney Cartoon Classics: Starring Chip 'n' Dale (VHS)
 Mickey and Company (VHS)
 Walt Disney Cartoon Classics: Starring Mickey & Minnie / Starring Chip 'n' Dale (LaserDisc)
 Walt Disney's Classic Cartoon Favorites: Starring Chip 'n' Dale (DVD)
 Chip 'n' Dale Volume 2: Trouble in a Tree (DVD)

References

External links 
 Dragon Around on IMDb
 Dragon Around at The Internet Animation Database
 Dragon Around at The Big Cartoon Database
 Dragon Around on Filmaffinity

Donald Duck short films
Films produced by Walt Disney
1950s Disney animated short films
Films directed by Jack Hannah
Animated films about dragons
1954 animated films
1954 short films
Films scored by Oliver Wallace
1950s English-language films
American animated short films
Films about ducks
RKO Pictures short films
RKO Pictures animated short films
Films about rodents
Animated films about mammals
Chip 'n' Dale films